Henry George Herbert Milles-Lade, 5th Earl Sondes (1 May 1940 – 2 December 1996), styled Viscount Throwley between 1941 and 1970, was a British peer. He inherited the title upon the death of his father in 1970 and the peerage became extinct when he died without an heir.

Personal life
The fifth earl was considered a colourful character. In his pre-teen years he was a page at the coronation of Queen Elizabeth II but was later expelled from Eton College for operating gambling books. He owned racehorses and greyhounds, but his strongest connection with sport was with football club, Gillingham F.C., where he served as vice-chairman of the board of directors. Upon his retirement from the role, a large clock was erected at the club's Priestfield Stadium and dubbed the "Lord Sondes Clock" in his honour. The clock was removed as part of ground redevelopment work in the 1990s and its current whereabouts are unknown.

The Earl was married four times.  His wives included the New York socialite Sharon McCluskey (daughter of Ellen Lehman McCluskey of the Lehman family), whom he married in 1981 and divorced in 1984, and another American whom he married in 1986, Phyllis Kane Schmertz (widow of Robert Schmertz, owner of the Boston Celtics), who survived him and inherited Lees Court in Kent, which she transformed into an agricultural business growing pharmaceutical and biofuel crops. The Earl died from cancer, and was buried in the church in the village of Sheldwich south of Faversham in Kent.

Lees Court estate
The estate at Earl Sondes death was  including a core of  around the villages of Sheldwich and Badlesmere with the balance at the Swale Estuary, Oare and Faversham Creeks.

Marriages
 1968 (divorced  1969) Primrose Ann Cresswell (former wife of Richard Hugh Nicholas Cresswell), daughter  of Lawrence Stopford Llewellyn Cotter (1912-1943) younger son of Sir James Laurence Cotter, 5th Baronet.
 1976 (divorced 1981) Countess Silvia-Gabrielle zu Salm-Reifferscheidt-Raitz (widow of Hugo, Altgraf zu Salm-Reifferscheidt-Raitz), daughter  of Hans Otto Schied.
 1981  (divorced 1984) Sharon McCluskey daughter of Ellen Lehman McCluskey of the Lehman Brothers  banking family.
 1986 Phyllis Kane Schmertz. Right Honourable Countess Sondes.

Title from birth
 The Honourable Henry George Herbert Milles-Lade (1 May 1940 – 17 January 1941)
 Viscount Throwley (17 January 1941 – 30 April 1970)
 The Right Honourable The Earl Sondes (30 April 1970 – 2 December 1996)

Family titles
There were no heirs to his titles and on Right Honourable Henry George Herbert 5th Earl Sonde's death on 2 December 1996  the titles became extinct.

 Earl Sondes of Lees Court, County of Kent, created letters patent  4 May 1880  – extinct 2 December 1996
 Visount Throwley of Throwley, County of Kent, created letters patent 4 May 1880 – extinct 2 December 1996
 Baron Sondes of Lees Court, County of Kent, created letters patent 20 May 1760  – extinct 2 December 1996

Arms

References

1940 births
1996 deaths
People from the Borough of Swale
People educated at Eton College
British socialites
Gillingham F.C. directors and chairmen
20th-century British farmers
Deaths from cancer
Henry Milles-Lade, 5th Earl Sondes
Henry